Gornji Babin Potok is a village in Croatia. It is connected by the D52 highway.

References 

Populated places in Lika-Senj County